Medical Museion is a museum and research unit in Copenhagen, Denmark, dedicated to the history of health and disease in a cultural perspective. Part of the Faculty of Health and Medical Sciences at University of Copenhagen, its principal area of interest is the recent history of the material and iconographic culture of biomedicine. It is based in a listed building from 1787 on Bredgade in Frederiksstaden.

History 

 

The collections were founded by a circle of medical doctors in Copenhagen in 1906. The first exhibition of medical history opened on 22 August 1907 as part of the celebrations of the 50th anniversary of the Danish Medical Association. The museum was then located in the Rigsdag building in Fredericiagade, which now houses the High Court of Eastern Denmark, but moved to its current premises in 1947.

The museum has been part of University of Copenhagen since 1918 and was called the Museum of Medical History until 2004 when it received its current name.

Building 
The museum is based in a Neoclassical building from 1787 designed by Peter Meyn which used to house Academy of Surgery, an institution which was responsible for the education of surgeons in Copenhagen between 1785 and 1842. The central exhibition space is the former auditorium where dissections were carried out as part of the training.

See also 
 List of museums in and around Copenhagen

References

External links 
 Official website
 Renderings by Peter Meyn
 Source

Museums in Copenhagen
University of Copenhagen
Medical museums
Science museums in Copenhagen
University museums in Denmark
Medical and health organizations based in Denmark